Arctostaphylos stanfordiana, with the common name Stanford's manzanita, is a species of manzanita that is endemic to northern California. It is known from the outer North Coast Ranges north of the San Francisco Bay Area.

Description
Arctostaphylos stanfordiana is a bushy shrub growing  in height. Leaves are oblong to widely lance-shaped, shiny green, and up to 5 centimeters long.

The inflorescence is a loose cluster of urn-shaped manzanita flowers which are pink, with some so pale that they are nearly white. The fruit is an oblong drupe about 7 millimeters wide.

Subspecies
There are three subspecies:
A. s. ssp. decumbens (Rincon manzanita) - rare subspecies endemic to Sonoma County
A. s. ssp. raichei (Raiche's manzanita) - known mostly from Mendocino County
A. s. ssp. stanfordiana (Stanford's manzanita) - more widespread than other subspecies

See also
California chaparral and woodlands
California montane chaparral and woodlands

External links

Jepson Manual Treatment - Arctostaphylos stanfordiana
USDA Plants Profile; Arctostaphylos stanfordiana
Arctostaphylos stanfordiana - Photo gallery

stanfordiana
Endemic flora of California
Natural history of the California chaparral and woodlands
Natural history of the California Coast Ranges
Stanford University
Plants described in 1887
Flora without expected TNC conservation status